Robert McKnight (January 20, 1820 – October 25, 1885) was an American lawyer and politician who represented Pennsylvania's 22nd congressional district in the United States House of Representatives from 1859 to 1863.

Early life and education 
Robert McKnight was born in Pittsburgh, Pennsylvania. He attended the common schools and a private school at Xenia, Ohio. He graduated from Princeton College in 1839.

Career 
He studied law, was admitted to the bar in 1842, and entered into a partnership with Henry S. Magraw in Pittsburgh. McKnight was hired to be a solicitor for the Bank of Pittsburgh in 1846. He served as a member of the Pittsburgh City Council from 1847 to 1849.  
McKnight was elected as a Republican to the Thirty-sixth and Thirty-seventh Congresses. He served his district during the American Civil War.

After his final term in 1863, he resumed the practice of law.

Personal life 
McKnight died in Pittsburgh in 1885. He was interned at the Allegheny Cemetery. Early Pittsburgh Pirates owner Denny McKnight was his son.

References

External links

1820 births
1885 deaths
Pittsburgh City Council members
People of Pennsylvania in the American Civil War
Pennsylvania lawyers
Politicians from Xenia, Ohio
Republican Party members of the United States House of Representatives from Pennsylvania
Burials at Allegheny Cemetery
19th-century American politicians
19th-century American lawyers